The Société des Artistes Français (meaning "Society of French Artists") is the association of French painters and sculptors established in 1881. Its annual exhibition is called the "Salon des artistes français" (not to be confused with the better-known Salon, established in 1667).

When the Société was established, it associated all the French artists. Its president was a painter and its vice-president a sculptor. The main task of the Société is to organize the Salon, since the French government ceased to do it.

Secession 

In December 1890 president Bouguereau suggested that the Salon should be an exhibition of young, yet unrecognized, artists. Ernest Meissonier, Puvis de Chavannes, Auguste Rodin and others rejected this proposal and left the organization. They quickly created their own exhibition (Société Nationale des Beaux-Arts in 1899) that was also named the Salon, officially Salon de la Société Nationale des Beaux–Arts, in short Salon du Champs de Mars.  The original Salon was sometimes called Salon de Champs-Élysées, or simply Salon des artistes français).

Presidents of the association since 1881  

 1881: Antoine-Nicolas Bailly, architect
 1891: Leon Bonnat, painter
 1896: Édouard Detaille, painter
 1900: Jean-Paul Laurens, painter
 1901: William Bouguereau, painter
 1904: Tony Robert-Fleury, painter
 1907: Henri-Paul Nénot, architect
 1910: Victor Laloux, architect
 1913: Antonin Mercie, sculptor
 1917: Francois Flameng, painter
 1920: Victor Laloux, architect
 1922: Jules Coutan, sculptor
 1924: Henri-Paul Nénot, architect
 1926: Paul Chabas, painter
 1936: Alphonse Defrasse, architect
 1939: , architect
 1941: Henri Bouchard, sculptor
 1945: , architect
 1947: Jules Formigé, architect
 1955: , architect
 1959: , painter
 1965: Georges Cheyssial, painter
 1977: Georges Muguet, sculptor
 1979: , painter
 1981: , painter
 1991: , painter
 1994: Jean Campistron, painter
 1997: Françoise Zig-Tribouilloy, engraver
 2000: Christian Billet, painter
 2010: Viviane Guybet, sculptor
 2013: Martine Delaleuf, architect

Present day 

The Société des Artistes Français still exists and organizes each year the "Salon des Artistes Français". Its current President is Ms. Martine Delaleuf.

See also 
 Salon
 Société Nationale des Beaux-Arts

External links 
 Société des Artistes Français (official website)
 

French artist groups and collectives
19th-century art groups
Société des Artistes Français
Modern art
1881 establishments in France